Grande-Rivière Château is a commune in the Jura department in Bourgogne-Franche-Comté in eastern France. It was established on 1 January 2019 by merger of the former communes of Grande-Rivière (the seat) and Château-des-Prés.

See also
Communes of the Jura department

References

Communes of Jura (department)